Pamela D. Toler is an American historian, who specializes in military history and women's history.

Biography 
Toler has a PhD in South Asian history from the University of Chicago.

Toler has written for Aramco World, Calliope, History Channel Magazine, MHQ: The Quarterly Journal of Military History, and on Time.com.

Toler lives in Chicago.

Her works
Women Warriors: An Unexpected History. Beacon Press, 2019. 
Heroines of Mercy Street. New York: Back Bay Books, Little Brown and Company 2017.  
Mankind: The Story of All of Us. Philadelphia, PA: Running Press Book Publishers, 2012. 
The Everything Guide to Understanding Socialism. Avon, MA: Adams Media, 2011.

References

External links 

American women historians
21st-century American historians
21st-century American women writers
University of Chicago alumni
American military historians
Women's historians
Historians of South Asia
Year of birth missing (living people)
Living people